Community Builders Group is the founding member of a group of humanitarian organizations operating in Burundi, Canada, DR Congo, Haiti, Kenya, Rwanda, Tanzania and Uganda. The network is known for supporting indigenous groups attempting to find their own natural pathways to self-sufficiency and wellness through bottom-up community initiatives.

History 
Community Builders Group was registered as a Canadian charity in 1983 and subsequently incorporated under the Society Act of British Columbia.

Philanthropic investments by the entrepreneurs enabled the purchase of two supportive housing centers in Vancouver, Canada (Jubilee Rooms on Main and Dodson Rooms on Hastings). Between 2002 and 2016, a total of 12 housing centers, supporting 800 persons, were added to the Community Builders network in Vancouver. Three new organizations (Anhart Foundation, Community Builders Foundation and Simpson Society) were established between 2012 and 2016 in order to support the growing number of housing centers and social employment businesses.

In 2005, Human Resources and Skills Development Canada, Anhart Holdings Ltd. and Community Builders Group sponsored a research project to determine the effects of best practices in privately owned rooming houses on persons at risk to homelessness.

Community Builders has received funding from the Homelessness Partnering Strategy since 2008 and became a member of the Canadian International Development Agency in 2009.

Operational activities

Supportive Housing
In Vancouver's Downtown Eastside, Community Builders operates 12 privately owned rooming houses that provide safe and supportive housing for 800 persons. The endeavor is coordinated by tenant support workers and utilizes a bottom-up approach to building management. A tenant-based "elders" team offers peer support and regulates tenant affairs. The low income and supportive housing centers are self-organizing and self-sustaining communities that promote best practices. The initiative is supported by public and private capital investments, and is assisted by community volunteers and innovative social services providers. Outcomes of Community Builders supportive housing efforts include a reduction in the risk factors that lead to homelessness (untreated mental illness and substance abuse) and a recidivism rate (return to homelessness) of less than 5%.

On October 24, 2018 it was determined by an RTB of BC arbitrator that "...I find that the tenant’s unit is not a transitional unit within the meaning of the Act and therefore the dispute between the parties falls within the Act and may be resolved through the application of the Act." A. Martin, Arbitrator Residential Tenancy Branch of British Columbia - Decision on File No: 31020359

Parent and Child Development Services
In 2006, Community Builders developed an initiative that supports at-risk children and parents in Greater Vancouver with housing and independent living assistance. Parent and Child Development Services is cost-effective and privately funded. The initiative provides an alternative to government-funded support services for parents and children.

International Relief and Development
Community Builders is involved in community-based development activities in Burundi, DR Congo, Haiti, Kenya, Rwanda, Tanzania and Uganda. International efforts are focused on self-sustaining development with indigenous controls in regions of extreme poverty. Community Builders and local partners in each region focus on the reduction of under-five mortality, maternal health issues, clean water and a pay-it-forward approach to micro credit.

Network
Community Builders serves as a network hub for sixteen organizations which have emerged from the Society's efforts since 1999. Partner organizations are: Anhart Foundation, Community Builders Group, Community Builders Benevolence Foundation (2013), Simpson Society Comitè MacDonald, Community Based Initiative, ABC Community Development, Women in Action Ministry, Katanga Community Development, Biribiret Community Development, Smart Ant Africa, Morogoro Community Development, Huruma Committee Italazya & True Grasses Uganda.

Sociological modeling of emergence 
Community Builders has pioneered research in a sociological modeling of emergence and has observed the effects of self-organization on groups of marginalized persons.

A 2005, the Community Builders' research initiative entitled "A Sociological Modeling of Emergence" performed a longitudinal survey of 140 persons at risk to homelessness in Vancouver's Downtown Eastside. The study established a Gold Standard of best practices for privately owned rooming houses and found that tenants experienced a 40-60% reduction in addiction and mental illness rates following a six-month stay in rooming houses which utilized best practices.

Another research paper entitled "Emergent models of wellness: a case study of management practices in single occupant hotels of Vancouver CA" (Alexiuk, M.D., Wiebe, G.K. And Pizzi, N.J.) was submitted to the Canadian Conference on Electrical and Computer Engineering, 2005.

Alexiuk, Wiebe and Pizzi utilized results of the aforementioned longitudinal study and argued that "The theory of emergence has become a useful framework for exploring salient features of dynamical systems. This framework provides insight into hitherto intractable problems in sociology and economics. One such problem is the definition of a mathematical model of homelessness that enables policy evaluation with respect to the holistic wellness of the impacted individuals. Swarm simulations provide numerical and visual results to the researcher allowing both quantitative and intuitive hypothesis testing. This paper defines a basic swarm model of homelessness, details some initial experiments and provides justification for a dynamical systems model."

Suggested reading on the Community Builders website includes: Harold Morowitz (The Emergence of Everything) and the descriptions of self-organizing societies by Jane Jacobs (The Death and Life of Great American Cities) and Deborah Gordon (Ants at Work).

References

External links 
 Community Builders Network website
 Metro Management 
Reax 
 Ladner, Peter (August 2004), Benevolent entrepreneur transforms New Dodson Hotel, Business in Vancouver, Retrieved June 1, 2011
 Global Affairs Canada website
 City of Vancouver Social Development Department website
 BC Housing website

Non-profit organizations based in Vancouver
Downtown Eastside